Vectorization may refer to:

Computing
 Array programming, a style of computer programming where operations are applied to whole arrays instead of individual elements
 Automatic vectorization, a compiler optimization that transforms loops to vector operations
 Image tracing, the creation of vector from raster graphics
 Word embedding, mapping words to vectors, in natural language processing

Other uses
 Vectorization (mathematics), a linear transformation which converts a matrix into a column vector
 Drug vectorization, to (intra)cellular targeting

See also
 Vector (disambiguation)
 Vector graphics (disambiguation)